Antoine Savignat (born 22 July 1975) is a French politician of The Republicans (LR) who served as member of the French National Assembly after winning a by-election in 2018 for Val-d'Oise's 1st constituency.

Political career
In parliament, Savignat served on the Committee on Legal Affairs. He was also a member of the Defence Committee from 2018 until 2019.

In 2021, Savignat and Jean-François Eliaou jointly wrote a parliamentary report on the situation of unaccompanied minors in France's criminal law.

He lost his seat in the first round of the 2022 French legislative election.

Political positions
In July 2019, Savignat voted against the French ratification of the European Union’s Comprehensive Economic and Trade Agreement (CETA) with Canada.

References

1975 births
Living people
Deputies of the 15th National Assembly of the French Fifth Republic
The Republicans (France) politicians
People from Cormeilles-en-Parisis
Members of Parliament for Val-d'Oise

21st-century French politicians